Film studies is an academic discipline that deals with various theoretical, historical, and critical approaches to cinema as an art form and a medium. It is sometimes subsumed within media studies and is often compared to television studies.

Film studies is less concerned with advancing proficiency in film production than it is with exploring the narrative, artistic, cultural, economic, and political implications of the cinema. In searching for these social-ideological values, film studies takes a series of critical approaches for the analysis of production, theoretical framework, context, and creation. Also, in studying film, possible careers include critic or production. Overall the study of film continues to grow, as does the industry on which it focuses.

Academic journals publishing film studies work include Sight & Sound, Film Comment, Film International, CineAction, Screen, Journal of Cinema and Media Studies, Film Quarterly, and Journal of Film and Video.

History
Film studies as an academic discipline emerged in the twentieth century, decades after the invention of motion pictures. Not to be confused with the technical aspects of film production, film studies exists only with the creation of film theory—which approaches film critically as an art—and the writing of film historiography. Because the modern film became an invention and industry only in the late nineteenth century, a generation of film producers and directors existed significantly before the academic analysis that followed in later generations.

Early film schools focused on the production and subjective critique of film rather than on the critical approaches, history and theory used to study academically. Since the time film was created, the concept of film studies as a whole grew to analyze the formal aspects of film as they were created. Established in 1919 the Moscow Film School was the first school in the world to focus on film. In the United States the USC School of Cinematic Arts, established in 1929, was the first cinematic based school, which was created in agreement with the Academy of Motion Picture Arts and Sciences. They were also the first to offer a major in film in 1932 but without the distinctions that are assumed in film studies. Universities began to implement different forms of cinema related curriculum without, however, the division between the abstract and practical approaches.

The Deutsche Filmakademie Babelsberg (i.e. German Film Academy Babelsberg) was founded in the Third Reich in 1938. Among the lecturers were e.g. Willi Forst and Heinrich George. To complete the studies at the Academy a student was expected to create his own film.

A movement away from Hollywood productions in the 1950s turned cinema into a more artistic independent endeavor. It was the creation of the auteur theory, which asserted film as the director's vision and art, that prompted film studies to become truly considered academically worldwide in the 1960s. In 1965, film critic Robin Wood, in his writings on Alfred Hitchcock, declared that Hitchcock's films contained the same complexities of Shakespeare's plays. Similarly, Jean Luc Godard, a contributor to the influential magazine Cahiers du Cinéma wrote, "Jerry Lewis...is the only one in Hollywood doing something different, the only one who isn't falling in with the established categories, the norms, the principles. ...Lewis is the only one today who's making courageous films.
With stable enrollment, proper budgets and interest in all humanities numerous universities contained the ability to offer distinct film studies programs.

As the global community of filmmakers and scholars grew, the analysis of film developed into an academic discipline. This was helped in part by large donations from successful commercial filmmakers, who helped fund film studies departments in universities. An example is George Lucas' US$175 million donation to the USC School of Cinematic Arts in 2006.

Approaches to film studies 

 Analytic
 Cognitive film theory
 Historical poetics
 Linguistic film theory
 Neoformalism
 Classical
 Formalist film theory
 Continental
 Feminist film theory
 Film semiotics
 Marxist film theory
 Psychoanalytic film theory
 Screen theory
 Structuralist film theory
 Criticism
 Auteur theory
 Schreiber theory

Modern film studies
Today film studies exists worldwide as a discipline with specific schools dedicated to it. The aspects of film studies have grown to encompass numerous methods for teaching history, culture and society. Many liberal arts colleges and universities contain courses specifically geared toward the analysis of film. Also exemplifying the increased diversity of film studies is the fact that high schools across the United States offer classes on film theory. Many programs conjoin film studies with media and television studies, taking knowledge from all parts of visual production in the approach. With the growing technologies such as 3-D film and YouTube, films are now concretely used to teach a reflection of culture and art around the world as a primary medium. Due to the ever-growing dynamic of film studies, a wide variety of curricula have emerged for analysis of critical approaches used in film. Although each institution has the power to form the study material, students are usually expected to grasp a knowledge of conceptual shifts in film, a vocabulary for the analysis of film form and style, a sense of ideological dimensions of film, and an awareness of extra textual domains and possible direction of film in the future. Universities offer their students a course in the field of film analysis to critically engage with the production of films which also allows the students to take part in research and seminars of specialized topics to enhance their critical abilities.

Common curriculum

The curriculum of tertiary level film studies programs often include but are not limited to:
 Introduction to film studies
 Modes of film studies
 Close analysis of film
 History of film/media
 Analysis with emphasis
 Attention to time period
 Attention to regional creation
 Attention to genre
 Attention to creators
 Methods of film production
With diverse courses that make up for film studies majors or minors come to exist within schools.

United States film studies
In the United States, universities offer courses specifically toward film studies, and schools committed to minor/major programs.

Currently 144 different tertiary institutions nationwide offer a major program in film studies. This number continues to grow each year with new interest in the film studies discipline. Institutions offering film degrees as part of their arts or communications curriculum differ from institutions with a dedicated film program. The curriculum is in no way limited to films made in the United States; a wide variety of films can be analyzed.

With the American film industry generating by far the highest global box office returns and second worldwide only to India in terms of number of filmgoers and number of productions, the attraction for film studies is high. To obtain a degree in the United States, a person is likely to pursue careers in the production of film, especially directing and producing films. Often classes in the United States will combine new forms of media, such as television or new media, in combination with film study. Those who study film want to be able to analyze the numerous films released in the United States every year in a more academic setting, or to understand the history of cinema as an art form. Films can reflect the culture of the period not only in the United States but around the world.

World film studies
Film studies throughout the world exist in over 20 countries. Due to the high cost of film production developing countries are left out of the film industry especially in the academic setting. Despite this fact more prosperous countries have the ability to study film in all the aspects of film studies.   Discourse in film can be found in the schools around the world; often, international attention to the aesthetics of film emerge from film festivals. For example, the Cannes Film Festival is the most prestigious in the world. Though this discourse revolves around the film industry and promotion and does not exist within an academic school setting, numerous aspects of analysis and critical approaches are taken into account on this international stage.

Prominent scholars

Hugo Münsterberg
Ricciotto Canudo
Germaine Dulac
Béla Balázs
Siegfried Kracauer
Vsevolod Pudovkin
Jean Epstein
Sergei Eisenstein
Lev Kuleshov
Jean Mitry
Rudolf Arnheim
Paul Rotha
André Bazin
Alexandre Astruc
Gilles Deleuze
Stanley Cavell
Andrew Sarris
Jean-Louis Baudry
Christian Metz
François Truffaut
Robin Wood
Noël Burch
Raymond Durgnat
E. Ann Kaplan
Jeanine Basinger
Teresa de Lauretis
Peter Wollen
Richard Barsam
Teshome Gabriel
Raymond Bellour
Molly Haskell
Marsha Kinder
Vivian Sobchack
Claire Johnston
Laura Mulvey
Robert Stam
James Naremore
Bill Nichols
James Monaco
Jacques Aumont
Pam Cook
Peter Bondanella
Barbara Creed
Jonathan Rosenbaum
Thomas Elsaesser
Serge Daney
Hamid Naficy
Richard Dyer
Ian Christie
Dudley Andrew
Annette Kuhn
Janet Staiger
Linda Williams
Noël Carroll
Francesco Casetti
David Bordwell
Michel Chion
B. Ruby Rich
Slavoj Žižek
Colin MacCabe
Kristin Thompson
Mary Ann Doane
Elizabeth Cowie
Jonathan Beller
Geoff Andrew
Adrian Martin
David Kipen
Mark Cousins

Academic journals 

 Cinema Journal
 Film Quarterly
 Historical Journal of Film, Radio and Television
 Journal of Film and Video
 Journal of Popular Film & Television
 New Review of Film and Television Studies
 Screen
 The Velvet Light Trap
 Television & New Media

See also

Cinemeducation, the use of film in medical education
Cinephilia
Film genre
Filmmaking
Glossary of motion picture terms
Experimental film
Fictional film
History of film
Philosophy of film
Outline of film

References

Further reading
Bergan, Ronald. Film. New York: DK Pub., 2006.
Dix, Andrew. Beginning Film Studies. Manchester UP.
Grant, Barry Keith. Film Study in the Undergraduate Curriculum. New York: Modern Language Association of America, 1983.
Osborne, Richard. Film Theory for Beginners. London, Zidane Press. 2016. 
Polan, Dana, and Haidee Wasson. "Young Art, Old Colleges." Inventing Film Studies. Durham: Duke UP, 2008.
Polan, Dana. Scenes of Instruction: The Beginnings of the U.S. Study of Film (UC Press, 2007)
Sikov, Ed. Film Studies: an Introduction. New York: Columbia UP
Stam, Robert. Film Theory: an Introduction. Malden, MA: Blackwell, 2000.
Villarejo, Amy. Film Studies: the Basics. London: Routledge, 2007.

External links

FILMdrippink.com - Database providing academic & journalist texts about film & TV 
Main website for the Berkeley film studies 
Main website for USC School of Cinematic Arts
Main website for the Los Angeles Film School
Main website for the NYFA Film School
Film Studies in New Delhi, India
Film Connections in Washington D.C.
Website dedicated to the introduction to film art
List of the Top US Film Schools
Screensite listing of college film programs

Film
Media studies